The women's competition in skeleton at the 2022 Winter Olympics will be held on 11 February (runs 1 and 2) and 12 February (runs 3 and 4), at the Xiaohaituo Bobsleigh and Luge Track in Yanqing District of Beijing. Hannah Neise of Germany became the Olympic champion. Jaclyn Narracott of Australia won silver, and Kimberley Bos of the Netherlands bronze. For all of them these were their first Olympic medals, moreover, Narracott's and Bos's medals were the first Olympic medals in skeleton for Australia and the Netherlands. Bos's bronze was the first medal for Netherlands in an ice sport that doesn't involve any type of skating.

Great Britain failed to medal in skeleton for the first time ever. Because Christopher Grotheer won gold in the men's skeleton, Niese's gold meant that Germany swept the golds in Skeleton at these Olympics. This was also  first time in history of women's skeleton at the Olympics that no British athlete won a medal. A British woman had previously won a medal at every women's skeleton Olympic competition since it was introduced in 2002.

Background
The 2014 and 2018 champion Lizzy Yarnold retired from competitions. The silver medalist, Jacqueline Lölling, and the bronze medalist, Laura Deas, both qualified for the Olympics. Tina Hermann was the 2021 World champion. Lölling and Elena Nikitina are the silver and bronze medalists, respectively. Kimberley Bos won the 2021–22 Skeleton World Cup, followed by Janine Flock and Nikitina.

Qualification

A total of 25 quota spots were available to athletes to compete at the games. A maximum of three athletes could be entered by a NOC.

The World Ranking list as of January 16, 2022 will be used to distribute the quotas. Athletes will be ranked by their best seven results. At total of two countries in each gender will qualify the maximum of three athletes, while four countries will qualify two athletes and 11 countries will qualify one quota. If the host nation China fails to qualify in an event, the highest ranked sled from the country will take the last qualification slot. An athlete has to be ranked within the top 55 to be eligible to compete at the games.

Results

References

Skeleton at the 2022 Winter Olympics
Women's events at the 2022 Winter Olympics